Mistirio Treno (English: Mystery Train) is the third studio album by Greek singer Giorgos Sabanis, which was released on 24 March 2011 and is his first album with Cobalt Music. All the music on the album is done by Sabanis.

Track listing

Music videos
 "Ston Mation Sou To Gkrizo"
 "Makria Gia Oso Zo"
 "To Kalokairi Afto (Ston Ourano) "
"San To Fillo Ston Aera"

Personnel

Giorgos Sabanis – executive producer
Giorgos Kalfamanolis – photography
Antonis Kapiris – artwork
Soumka – mixing
Paul Stefanidis – mastering engineer
Hristos Avdelas – guitar, bass, drums
Sotiris Tsagdis – styling
Kostas Doxas – background vocals
Despina Olimpiou – background vocals
Thanos Papanikolaou – background vocals

References

Greek-language albums
2011 albums